Pigment yellow 139 is an organic compound that is used as a yellow-orange pigment.  It is classified as a derivative of isoindoline. This yellow-orange solid is virtually insoluble in most solvents.

The species is prepared by addition of ammonia to o-phthalonitrile to give the diiminoisoindoline, which in turn condenses with barbituric acid.

References

External links 

 Pigment Yellow 139

Pigments
Organic pigments
Shades of yellow